Cape Murmanskiy is an ice cape that projects from the west side of Lazarev Ice Shelf, about 25 nautical miles (46 km) north-northeast of Leningradskiy Island, in Queen Maud Land. Mapped by the Soviet Antarctic Expedition in 1959 and named by them for the city of Murmansk.

References

Headlands of Queen Maud Land
Princess Astrid Coast